Juan Antonio Martínez Marconi (born 1 May 1982) is a Chilean former footballer. His last club was then Primera B club Deportes Temuco. He played as goalkeeper.

References

External links

1982 births
Living people
Chilean footballers
Chilean Primera División players
Primera B de Chile players
Rangers de Talca footballers
Deportes Linares footballers
Deportes Temuco footballers
Lota Schwager footballers
Curicó Unido footballers
Association football goalkeepers